Ampullaceana ampla is a species of air-breathing freshwater snail, an aquatic pulmonate gastropod mollusc in the family Lymnaeidae, the pond snails.

Distribution 
This species is found in European countries including:
 Germany
 Poland
 Czech Republic
 Slovakia
 and others in Central and Eastern Europe.Then across the Palearctic to Siberia' The species lives in calm parts of rivers and lakes. They mostly stay on the shoreline near the water surface. A. ampla is relatively rare.

References 

 Vinarski, M.V.; Glöer, P. (2007). Taxonomical notes on Euro-Siberian freshwater molluscs. 1. Turbo patulus Da Costa, 1778 is not a senior synonym of Limneus ampla Hartmann, 1821 (Mollusca: Gastropoda: Lymnaeidae) Ruthenica. 17(1-2): 55-63

External links 

Lymnaeidae
Gastropods described in 1841